John William "Brick" Breeden (January 4, 1904 – August 13, 1977) was a college basketball coach and player. He was a player from 1926 to 1929, and the head coach at Montana State College (now University) in Bozeman from 1935 to 1954.

Born in Oyer, Missouri, Breeden moved to Montana with his family in 1918, and they settled in Bozeman two years later. He graduated from Gallatin County High School in 1925 and then attended Montana State College. As a star basketball player, he helped lead the Bobcats to the Helms Foundation national championship in 1929. Breeden was also student body president and a member of Sigma Chi fraternity.

He returned to the university in 1933 and was an assistant for two years. He coached Montana State to a  record and one NCAA tournament appearance, in 1951. After stepping down as head coach in 1954, he was the athletic director, then the career placement director until retirement in 1971.

After MSU, Breeden was a state senator for one term (1972–1974), but did not pursue a second due to health concerns. He died at his Bozeman home of natural causes at age 73 in 1977; the Brick Breeden Fieldhouse at MSU was named in his honor in 1981.

Head coaching record

References

External links
Legendary Locals of Bozeman – Brick Breeden

1904 births
1977 deaths
Basketball coaches from Montana
American men's basketball players
Basketball players from Missouri
Basketball players from Montana
Montana State Bobcats football coaches
Montana State Bobcats men's basketball coaches
Montana State Bobcats men's basketball players
Sportspeople from Bozeman, Montana
Montana state senators
20th-century American politicians
Basketball coaches from Missouri